Musotima dryopterisivora is a moth in the family Crambidae. It was described by Yoshiyasu in 1985. It is found in Japan.

The wingspan is 10–12 mm.

References

Moths described in 1985
Musotiminae